Lakeside Dairy Limited (LDL), is a dairy processing company located in Mbarara, Uganda.

Location 

Overview 
Lakeside Dairy Ltd., was incorporated on 15 July 2014 to acquire the business of Hillside Dairy & Agriculture Ltd., and carry on with the business of Dairy and Agriculture. It is a wholly owned subsidiary of Dodla Holdings Pvt Ltd, Singapore where the current investment is USD 3,000,000/- The company has also obtained Investments Licence No. SSD/112494/48186 for establishing a new class of manufacturing plant for processing milk and dairy products.

The group is in expansion mode in Eastern Africa and particularly in Uganda by diversifying its business portfolio. Keeping the above vision in mind, the promoters of the company took cognizance of the growing market of Dairy and Agriculture which are usually consumed directly or indirectly as ingredients in food.

Ownership 
LDL is a wholly owned subsidiary of Dodla Holdings Pte Ltd., Singapore.

Products 
The factory manufactures the following products among others:
 UHT FINO milk
 UHT ESL milk
 Yoghurt
 Ghee
 Paneer
 Cheese

See also 
 List of milk processing companies in Uganda
 Dairy industry in Uganda

References

Dairy products companies of Uganda